Hermann Klien (born 22 October 1932) is an Austrian gymnast. He competed in eight events at the 1960 Summer Olympics.

References

1932 births
Living people
Austrian male artistic gymnasts
Olympic gymnasts of Austria
Gymnasts at the 1960 Summer Olympics
Place of birth missing (living people)
20th-century Austrian people